Adele Bloch-Bauer (née Bauer; August 9, 1881 – January 24, 1925) was Viennese socialite, salon hostess, and patron of the arts from Austria-Hungary. A  Jewish woman, she is most well known for being the subject of two of artist Gustav Klimt's paintings: Portrait of Adele Bloch-Bauer I and Portrait of Adele Bloch-Bauer II, and the fate of the paintings during and after the Nazi Holocaust. She has been called "the Austrian Mona Lisa."

Biography
Adele Bauer was born in Vienna, Austria-Hungary, on August 9, 1881, to Moritz and Jeannette  (née Honig) Bauer. Her father was a railway and bank director. 

She met her future husband, Ferdinand Bloch, at the wedding of her sister Therese to Ferdinand's brother Gustav Bloch in 1898. Adele and Ferdinand became engaged the next year, followed by marriage in Vienna's Stadttempel on December 19, 1899. Ferdinand was a wealthy businessman who owned a sugar refinery in Bruck an der Mur, Austria. 

In 1903, he commissioned the artist Gustav Klimt to paint a portrait of his wife, which was completed in 1907 and became the Portrait of Adele Bloch-Bauer I. Kimberly Bradley of the BBC wrote the portrait transformed Bloch-Bauer into an "icon". In 1912, Bloch-Bauer again sat for Klimt for a portrait, which became the Portrait of Adele Bloch-Bauer II. 

In sitting for Klimt twice, she is the only verified person to be painted by the artist twice in full length. Bloch-Bauer became a Viennese socialite, regularly hosting artists and authors in her salon. Among the many people she hosted were conductors Gustav Mahler and Richard Strauss. She also socialized with royalty, including Prince Adolph Schwarzenberg.

Maria Altmann, the niece of Bloch-Bauer, stated: 

In 1925, Bloch-Bauer died of meningitis.

Paintings

Klimt's website says that Bloch-Bauer was his mistress.  He painted her at least twice. The first portrait was a gift to Adele's parents. Some artists also think Adele Bloch-Bauer might be the woman in The Kiss and Judith and the Head of Holofernes.

Legal case
During World War II, the Nazis stole Portrait of Adele Bloch-Bauer I from Bloch-Bauer's family.  It ended up in the Belvedere Gallery.

In Republic of Austria v. Altmann in 2004, Adele Bloch-Bauer's niece, Maria Altmann, tried to get the painting back from the Belvedere Gallery. The Supreme Court of the United States said the painting was Altmann's.  Because Altmann could not pay for insurance and storage, she sold the painting to Ronald Lauder to put in the Neue Gallery in New York City.

Legacy
Bloch-Bauer was the  subject of the 2009 children's book Adorable Adele by Peter Stephan Jungk.

In 2016, the city of Vienna named a street, Bloch-Bauer Promenade, after her and her husband.

In popular culture

The 2015 film Woman in Gold is about Maria Altmann's case.  Adele Bloch-Bauer is shown in flashbacks.

References

1881 births
1925 deaths
Austrian Jews
Jews and Judaism in Vienna
Subjects of Nazi art appropriations